Kinel is a city in Samara Oblast, Russia, located on the Bolshoy Kinel River near its confluence with the Samara River,  east of Samara. Population:

History
It was founded in 1837. In 1877, during the construction of the Samara–Orenburg railroad, the railway station of Kinel was built nearby. The station became a junction by 1888. In 1944, Kinel was granted city status.

Administrative and municipal status
Within the framework of administrative divisions, Kinel serves as the administrative center of Kinelsky District, even though it is not a part of it. As an administrative division, it is, together with two urban-type settlements, incorporated separately as the city of federal subject significance of Kinel—an administrative unit with the status equal to that of the districts. As a municipal division, the town of oblast significance of Kinel is incorporated as Kinel Urban Okrug.

References

Notes

Sources

Cities and towns in Samara Oblast